Mississippi Highway 331 (MS 331) is a  south-north state highway in the North Central Hills region of northern Mississippi, connecting MS 9 to MS 334. It is generally a narrow two-lane route.

It starts on MS 9 southwest of Sarepta, and extends north to or near Tula and ends on MS 334 north of Tula.

Route description

MS 331 begins at an intersection with MS 9 in northern Calhoun County, roughly five miles north of Bruce and three miles west of Sarepta. It heads north through farmland for a couple of miles before entering the hilly, remote, wooded terrain of the Holly Springs National Forest. The highway then enters Lafayette County. MS 331 winds its way through hills of the National Forest for several miles before exiting and immediately passing through community of Tula. The highway now crosses the Yocona River before coming to an end at an intersection with MS 334 at the community of Cornish.

The entire length of Mississippi Highway 331 is a rural, two-lane, state highway.

Major intersections

References

External links

331
Transportation in Lafayette County, Mississippi
Transportation in Calhoun County, Mississippi